The Mediterranean Games is a multi-sport event organised by the International Committee of Mediterranean Games (CIJM). It is held every four years among athletes from countries bordering the Mediterranean Sea in Africa, Asia and Europe. The first Mediterranean Games were held in 1951 in Alexandria, Egypt, while the most recent games were held in 2022 in Oran, Algeria.

History 

The idea was proposed at the 1948 Summer Olympics by Muhammed Taher Pasha, chairman of the Egyptian Olympic Committee and vice-president of the International Olympic Committee (I.O.C.), assisted by the Greek member of the I.O.C. Ioannis Ketseas. Separate Mediterranean sports events preceded the games. From 1947 to 1949, the Mediterranean Athletics Championships were contested, and the Mediterranean Cup football competition was held in 1949 and 1950. The first official Mediterranean Games were held in Egypt in 1951.

The Games were inaugurated in October 1951, in Alexandria, Egypt, in honour of Muhammed Taher Pasha, with contests being held in 13 sports along with the participation of 734 athletes from 10 countries. In 1955, in Barcelona, during the II Games, the set up was decided of a Supervisory and Controlling Body for the Games, a kind of Executive Committee. The decisions were finally materialized on 16 June 1961, and the said Body was named, upon a Greek notion, ICMG (International Committee for the Mediterranean Games). Twelve countries have hosted the Mediterranean Games: four from Africa: Egypt (1951), Tunisia (1967, 2001), Algeria (1975, 2022) and Morocco (1983); six from Europe: Spain (1955, 2005, 2018), Italy (1963, 1997, 2009), Turkey (1971, 2013), Yugoslavia (1979), Greece (1991) and France (1993) and two from Asia: Lebanon (1959) and Syria (1987).

The first 11 games always took place one year before the Summer Olympic Games. However, since 1993, they have been held the year after the Olympic Games. This transition means that the only time the Mediterranean Games were not held four years after the previous Games was in 1993, when Languedoc-Roussillon in France hosted the Games just two years after Athens. In 2018, the Med Games calendar was reset again when Tarragona hosted the Games in the mid-even year between the Summer Olympic Games (and the same year as the FIFA Men's World Cup).

Description 

The Mediterranean Games, in terms of the preparation and composition of the National Delegation, are held under the auspices of the International Olympic Committee and the Hellenic Olympic Committee (HOC). However, their establishment too must be credited to the HOC, for it held a leading part in their being founded despite all difficulties.

Athens is the permanent seat of the ICMG (regardless of who the President might be) and the committee's General Secretary is Greek. This comes as a further tribute to Greece, highlighting its leading role with regard to the function and strengthening of the institution. Except that Greece bailed out of its 2013 Mediterranean Games commitment when the two cities of Volos and Larissa were supposed to host the 2013 edition of the Games.  But because of Greece's financial troubles, they had to give that up and the 2013 honors went instead to Turkey, with the city of Mersin rescuing the 2013 edition of the Games instead.

Participating countries 

At present, 26 countries participate in the games:

Africa: Algeria, Egypt, Libya, Morocco and Tunisia
Asia: Lebanon, Syria and Turkey.
Europe:  Albania, Andorra, Bosnia and Herzegovina, Croatia, Cyprus, France, Greece, Italy, Kosovo, Malta, Monaco, Montenegro, North Macedonia, Portugal, San Marino, Serbia, Slovenia and Spain 

Kosovo was accepted as a member of the International Committee of Mediterranean Games in October 2015 and participated for the first time in the 2018 Mediterranean Games in Tarragona, Spain. One athlete representing the Vatican City participated in an unofficial ("non-scoring") manner in the women's half marathon event at the 2022 Mediterranean Games in Oran, Algeria.

Of all the National Olympic Committees within the Olympic Movement bordering the Mediterranean Sea, Israel and Palestine have not participated in the games, nor has Great Britain who represents the British Overseas Territory of Gibraltar and Akrotiri and Dhekelia.

In the case of Israel, Allen Guttman in The Games Must Go On argued that Israel's exclusion is both antisemitic and politically motivated due to antagonism towards Israel by the participating Arab nations. The IOC's Avery Brundage was not supportive of Israel's desire to compete, saying: "I cannot understand why anyone wants to go where he is not wanted". The International Amateur Athletics Federation pushed the issue at the 1959 Mediterranean Games in Beirut by refusing to grant permission to hold an athletics competition unless Israel were allowed to compete. Lebanese games organizer Gabriel Gemayel conceded to this, but sidestepped the ruling by holding a parallel Lebanese Games comprising athletics events between the present nations alongside the official Mediterranean Games competitions.

There are countries not bordering the Mediterranean Sea which nonetheless participate: Portugal, Andorra, Kosovo, San Marino, Serbia and North Macedonia. Serbia, Kosovo and North Macedonia were all formerly part of Yugoslavia, which competed until its breakup and dissolution. 

The Hellenic Olympic Committee has suggested that nine more countries that do not satisfy geographic criteria could be allowed to participate, such as Bulgaria, and some Arab countries such as Jordan and Iraq. Portugal competed in the 2018 Mediterranean Games after a decision which approved Portugal as effective National Olympic Committee.

Flag 

The symbol of the Mediterranean Games consists of three rings representing Asia, Africa and Europe, the three continents involved in this competition. The rings dissolve in a wavy line in their lower part, as if they were immersed in the Mediterranean Sea. During the closing ceremony, the flag is transferred to the country of the city chosen to host the next Mediterranean Games.

Mediterranean Games 
No inland city has ever hosted the games. All but one of the host cities to date have been situated on the Mediterranean coast (Casablanca is located on the Atlantic coast).

Notes

All-time medal table 
Medal Table 1951 – 2022

- Yugoslavia competed in 1997 and 2001 as FR Yugoslavia.

- Serbia competed in 2005 as Serbia and Montenegro.
(*) Yugoslavia participated in the Games before its breakup and the establishment of the constituent republics
(**) The UAR included at the time Egypt and Syria
(***) Honorary participation in the MG Tunis 2001

Competitions

Throughout the history of the Mediterranean Games, 33 different sports have been presented.

See also 
Mediterranean Beach Games

References

External links 

cijm.orgInternational Mediterranean Games Committee

 
1951 establishments in Africa
1951 establishments in Asia
1951 establishments in Europe
Games
Multi-sport events
Quadrennial sporting events
Recurring sporting events established in 1951